Shediac (official in both languages; Shédiac is colloquial French) is a heavily Acadian town in Westmorland County, New Brunswick. The town is home to the famous Parlee Beach and is known as the "Lobster Capital of the World". It hosts an annual festival every July which promotes its ties to lobster fishing. At the western entrance to the town is a 90-ton sculpture called The World's Largest Lobster. It is believed that chiac, a well-known French accent, was named after Shediac.

Since its founding it has expanded several times, most recently in 2023, when it annexed all or part of four local service districts. Revised census figures have not been released.

Etymology
Shediac was originally called La Batture. Its name was later changed to Shediac in reference to its position at the basin of the Shediac River. The name "Shediac" itself is derived from the Micmac word Esedeiik, which means "which comes from far away", possibly in reference to the Shediac Bay or the current of the Petitcodiac river.

Geography
Shediac is situated primarily on Route 133 around Shediac Bay, a sub-basin of the Northumberland Strait.

Its topography is relatively flat and its soil is mostly composed of sedimentary rocks dating from the Pennsylvanian. Shediac enjoys a continental climate.

The town is located southwest and adjacent to the community of Pointe-du-Chêne, once the eastern terminus of the European and North American Railway as well as a stopover for Pan-Am's transatlantic "clipper" air service featuring large seaplanes. Imperial Airways' flying boat service to Foynes in Ireland also used the facilities.

History

Hundreds of years ago, the Mi'kmaq encampment of "Es-ed-ei-ik" was one of the major camps in southeast New Brunswick. The Mi'kmaq word "Es-ed-ei-ik" which means "running far in" (in reference to the tide, which has a long range over the shallow, sandy beaches) eventually transformed into Gédaique.

Acadians first arrived at Shediac in 1751 as a result of the Acadian Exodus from peninsular Nova Scotia. During the French and Indian War, French officer Charles Deschamps de Boishebert made his headquarters at both Shediac and Cocagne, New Brunswick. In the autumn of 1755, Boishebert established himself on the south shore of Cocagne Bay, a place known as Boishebert's Camp.  The following year, Boishebert moved to Miramichi, New Brunswick, specifically to Beaubears Island.  After the war, Acadians returned to the region in 1767.

Today many francophones use the spelling Shédiac; however, the town's name upon its incorporation did not feature an accented "e", and correspondingly the official geographic name for the community is Shediac.

Shediac Bay Yacht Club
Shediac Bay Yacht Club is on the Register of 'Canada's Historic Places' for being the location of a local wharf for nearly a century. The previous Shediac Bay Yacht Club House was designed by Roméo Savoie.

Demographics

Income (2015)

Mother tongue (2016)

Notable people

 Georges-Antoine Belcourt (1803–1874), missionary
 Edna May Williston Best (1880–1923), feminist
 Emile Duprée (1936 – ), former professional wrestler and promoter
 René Duprée (1983 – ), professional wrestler, former WWE wrestler, son of Émile Dupree
 Muriel McQueen Fergusson (1899–1987), Canadian senator
 Gord Gallant (1950 – ), professional hockey player
 Placide Gaudet (1850–1930), journalist, historian
 Daniel Lionel Hanington (1835–1909), former Premier of New Brunswick
 Rosa Laricchiuta (1974 – ), professional singer
 Joseph E. Leblanc (born 1916), politician
 Samuel Lee (1756–1805), judge, politician
 Anna Malenfant (1905–1988), singer, educator and composer
 Edward R. McDonald (1872–1952), lawyer, politician, mayor, inventor of the Crossword Game, 1926
 Olivier-Maximin Melanson (1854–1926), Acadian businessman and politician 
 A. P. Paterson (1870–1957), politician
 Scott Pellerin (b. 1970), former professional hockey player
 Pascal Poirier (1852–1933), writer, lawyer, senator
 Jean George Robichaud (1883–1969), politician
 Ferdinand-Joseph Robidoux (1875–1962), lawyer, politician
 Wes Sheridan, Canadian politician
 Albert James Smith (1822–1883), former Premier of New Brunswick
 Ernest A. Smith (1864 – ?), Canadian politician
 Elsie Wayne (1932–2016), politician
 John Clarence Webster (1862–1950), physician, historian

Sister city
Breaux Bridge, Louisiana since 1970

See also
List of lighthouses in New Brunswick
List of communities in New Brunswick
 Media in Moncton
 Greater Moncton
 Greater Shediac

References

Further reading
 Webster. A History of Shediac. 1928
 Belliveau, John Edward (2003) Running Far In: The Story of Shediac. Halifax, Nova Scotia: Nimbus Publishing Ltd,

Bordering communities

External links

 Greater Shediac Area website

 
Populated coastal places in Canada
Towns in New Brunswick
Lighthouses in New Brunswick
Populated places established in the 18th century